Super Tight... is the second studio album by American hip hop duo UGK. The album was released on August 30, 1994, by Jive Records. As of 2011, it has sold 375,000 copies. Super Tight... is notable for being the first UGK album to have The Meters guitarist Leo Nocentelli featured as a session musician.

Track listing
 All songs written by Chad Butler and Bernard Freeman, except where noted.

Personnel
Credits adapted from liner notes and Allmusic

 Pimp C - programming, recording engineer
 Leo Nocentelli - guitar
 David Tornkanowsky - piano, organ
 Chris Severin - bass
 Tim Kimsey - recording engineer, mixing
 Tim Latham - recording engineer, mixing
 Matthew Burrus - recording engineer
 Sterling Winnfield - recording engineer
 Roger Tausz - mixing
 Tom Coyne - mastering
 Shawn Mortensen - photography

Chart positions

References

1994 albums
UGK albums
Jive Records albums